Beluran is the capital of the Beluran District in the Sandakan Division of Sabah, Malaysia. Its population was estimated to be around 3,132 in 2010. The population is a mixture of many ethnic groups, with the Kadazan-Dusun, Tidong and Orang Sungai communities being the four largest components. The town is located about 88 kilometres from Sandakan town.

References

External links 

Beluran District
Towns in Sabah